Zane Tetevano (born 4 November 1991) is a professional rugby league footballer who plays as a  and  for the Leeds Rhinos in the Betfred Super League. He has played for both the Cook Islands and New Zealand at international level. 

Tetevano previously played for the Newcastle Knights, Sydney Roosters and the Penrith Panthers in the NRL. He won an NRL premiership with the Roosters in 2018.

Background
Tetevano was born in Tokoroa, New Zealand, and is of Cook Islander and Maori descent. 

Tetevano played his junior football for the Pacific Sharks before being signed by the Newcastle Knights. In 2006, Tetevano played for the New Zealand Under 16s team.

Playing career

Newcastle Knights
From 2008 to 2010, Tetevano played for the Newcastle Knights' NYC team.

In 2011, Tetevano moved on to the Knights' New South Wales Cup team.

In Round 20 of the 2011 NRL season, Tetevano made his NRL debut for Newcastle against the Cronulla-Sutherland Sharks.

In August 2011, Tetevano re-signed with the Knights on a 2-year contract.

On 16 October 2013, Tetevano again re-signed with the Newcastle Knights on a 2-year contract.

On 14 May 2014, Tetevano was sacked by the Newcastle Knights due to disciplinary reasons.

Wyong Roos
Tetevano joined the Wyong Roos in the New South Wales Cup for the rest of 2014.

Manly
On 1 October 2014, Tetevano signed a 1-year contract with the Manly-Warringah Sea Eagles starting in 2015.

On 2 October 2014, Tetevano had his contract with Manly-Warringah terminated after he admitted in court to bashing his girlfriend on four occasions.

In September 2016, Tetevano was named at lock in the 2016 Intrust Super Premiership NSW Team of the Year.

Sydney Roosters
On 1 October 2016, Tetevano signed a 1-year contract with the Sydney Roosters starting in 2017.

On 30 September 2018, Tetevano was part of the Sydney Roosters side which defeated Melbourne 21-6 in the 2018 NRL Grand Final.

In round 25 2019, Tetevano played his 100th NRL game in the Roosters 16-10 loss to South Sydney at ANZ Stadium.
Tetevano made 24 appearances for the Sydney Roosters in the 2019 NRL season as the club reached the 2019 NRL Grand Final.  Tetevano was initially named in the grand final team but was then replaced by Jake Friend and missed out on playing in the club's premiership victory.  Following the match, Sydney Roosters head coach Trent Robinson gave Tetevano his premiership ring.

Penrith Panthers
On 26 November 2019, Tetevano signed a three-year contract with Penrith worth around $350,000 starting in the 2020 NRL season.

Leeds Rhinos
On 26 December 2020, it was reported that Tetevano would join Leeds for the 2021 season.

In the Challenge Cup third-round match against St Helens, Tetevano was sent off in the club's defeat for the first time in his career.  He was later given a four-match ban and fined £500.
Tetevano played for Leeds in their 36-8 loss against St Helens in the semi-final as the club fell one match short of the 2021 Super League Grand Final.
In round 16 of the 2022 Super League season, Tetevano was given a red card for a dangerous tackle during Leeds 42-12 loss against St Helens.
On 24 September 2022, Tetevano played for Leeds in their 24-12 loss to St Helens RFC in the 2022 Super League Grand Final.

International
In 2009, Tetevano played for the Cook Islands in the 2009 Pacific Cup and again in 2010.

At the end of 2013, Tetevano played for the Cook Islands in the 2013 Rugby League World Cup held in England and Wales.

Domestic violence conviction
In 2014, Tetevano pled guilty and was sentenced to at least nine months jail for bashing his then girlfriend on four separate occasions. However, the jail time was overturned on appeal. During the appeal Judge Roy Ellis was "impressed with his rehabilitation", and Tetevano's commitment to living "a simple life", while his lawyer argued that he had "no desire to return to the toxic environment that the NRL invites".

References

External links

Leeds Rhinos profile
Sydney Roosters profile
Roosters profile

1990 births
Living people
Central Coast Centurions players
Combined Nationalities rugby league team players
Cook Island sportspeople
Cook Islands national rugby league team players
Expatriate rugby league players in Australia
Leeds Rhinos players
Nelson Bay Blues players
New Zealand expatriate rugby league players
New Zealand expatriate sportspeople in Australia
New Zealand national rugby league team players
New Zealand Māori rugby league players
New Zealand Māori rugby league team players
New Zealand sportspeople of Cook Island descent
New Zealand rugby league players
Newcastle Knights players
Penrith Panthers players
Rugby league locks
Rugby league players from Tokoroa
Rugby league props
Sydney Roosters players
Wyong Roos players